The Balathandayuthapani Temple, officially the Arulmigu Balathandayuthapani Kovil, better known as the Waterfall Hill Temple or "Thaneer Malai"  by locals, is a temple complex located in George Town, Penang.  The main deity of this temple is Murugan. Visitors need to climb 513 stairs to reach the temple. It is the focal point of the Hindu festival of Thaipusam in Malaysia, after the Batu Caves. The hilltop temple, with its seven-storey 21.6m-tall gopuram (main tower), has been touted as the largest Lord Murugan temple outside India.

History
The grand consecration ceremony (Kumbabishegam) of the newly completed Arulmigu Balathandayuthapani temple was held on 29 June 2012. Built at a cost of 10 million ringgit, this temple is said to be the largest Murugan temple outside India.

The timeline of the temple :
 1800 - The shrine located at the base of the great Waterfall within the current Penang Botanic Gardens became the focal point of Thaipusam Festival
 1856 - The earliest known view of the temple at the base of the waterfall through a painting done by Captain Charles Henry Cazalet, thus proving the existence of the temple by then.
 1892 - The Waterfall Reservoir was constructed
 1905 - The formation of the Mohammedan and Hindu Endowments Board
 1913 - To prevent contamination of the water supply at the Waterfall Temple, plans are on the way to remove the Waterfall Temple. Reported out on 13 November  1913 (The Singapore Free Press and Mercantile Advertiser)
 1914 - A new piece of land having an area of 10 acres, 2 rods, 28 poles known as Lot 5 Mukim XVI was purchased by the then “Mohammedan and Hindu Endowments Board” at a cost of 7,500 Straits Dollars for the purpose of the erection of a new Hindu temple. Reported out on 9 May 1914 (Malaya Tribune)
 1915 - Thaipusam was celebrated at the Hilltop Temple instead of the Waterfall temple for the first time in February 1915. Reported out on 7 June 1915 (Malaya Tribune)
 1985 - The Old Hilltop Temple was rebuilt and the Maha Kumbhabishegam conducted on 28 January 1985
 2006 - Work begins on the New Hilltop Temple at a new site 30 meters above the old site
 2012 - The New Hilltop Temple Maha Kumbabhishegam was conducted on 29 June 2012. The Thaipusam festival of 2013 was for the first time held in the New Hilltop Temple

Golden Chariot
A RM3mil golden chariot hit the streets on the eve of Thaipusam on 8 February 2017. The 1.6-tonne golden chariot measuring 4.3m-high and 4m-wide will feature two golden horses in the front with several statues adorning the kalasam (tower). The chariot bearing Lord Muruga's vel (spear) will move on rubberised wheels pulled by devotees. The inner frame of the chariot was made in Karaikudi and shipped to Penang, where it was assembled.

The golden chariot's journey will be from the Arulmigu Sri Maha Mariamman Temple in Queen Street to the Arulmigu Sri Ganesha Temple in Jalan Kebun Bunga. The chariot would be placed at the Sri Ganesha Temple for two days, on Thaipusam eve and on Thaipusam day.

An 18-day pooja (special prayers) session will be conducted for The 0.9m-tall golden vel at Queen Street Maha Mariamman Temple. This depicts the story goes that the vel was created by Lord Shiva's consort Parasakthi who is also Lord Murugan's mother. Parasakthi appeared in 18 forms before merging into a single indestructible vel which was handed to Lord Murugan during the Poosa natchathiram on Pournami Day (full moon) in the month of Thai (January to February). After receiving a blessing from the Lord's mother, the vel will be sent back to Lord Murugan on the golden chariot on Thaipusam eve.

The golden chariot successfully completed its first trial run for Thaipusam in on 2 February 2017 about two hours through George Town in the presence of a large throng of devotees seeing it for the first time. The chariot went 3 km along Jalan Kebun Bunga, Lorong Air Terjun, Jalan Tunku Abdul Rahman, Jalan Macalister, Jalan Residensi and Jalan Utama before returning to the temple.

Temples and Halls

Arulmigu Balathandayuthapani Temple (Main Temple)
The main temple inside the complex. Devotees need to climb 513 steps to reach the temple. The temple is 70,000 sq ft grounds large and built at the cost of RM10 million

Thannermalai Sri Ayyappan Swamy Temple
Another temple on the hill. Located beside the main temple

Arulmigu Sree Ganeshar Temple
Another temple of the Arulmigu Balathandayuthapani Temple complex, is dedicated to lord Ganesha. The temple located on the foothill and first temple to visit before climbing up to the main temple. Arulmigu Sree Ganeshar was constructed in 1951 by the Hindu Mahajana Sangam

Arulmigu Naga Naathar Temple
A small shine dedicated to Naga Naathar or King Cobra.

Shiva Statue of Balathandayuthapani Temple
8.23m-tall statue of Lord Shiva at the foot of the hill.

Hindu Mahajana Sangam Madam
See Also : Hindu Mahajana Sangam

Hindi Mahajana Sangam or also known as Gandhiji Ashram among locals, is a community hall at the foot of the Balathandayuthapani Temple. The hall was built by the early Indian settlers who were the waterfront workers in late 1920s and was originally known as Madaalayam or Kootakadai Madam. The Sangam intends to preserve the Dewan Mahatma Gandhi building as a heritage building as in our view this is the only building that exist today which is based on the South Indian Architecture left in the whole of Malaysia.

Daily Poojas
Darshan (open to the public) hours are from 6:45 am to 9:00 pm. The temple remains closed from 12:15 pm, reopens at 4:30 pm and closes at 9:15 pm. The temple priests perform the puja (rituals) daily, as well as during festivals

Abishegam or Thirumanjanam is the anointment of the idol with oils, sandalwood paste, milk, unguents and the like and then bathing it with water in an act of ritual purification. The most prominent abishegams are conducted at the ceremonies to mark the hours of the day. These are four in number: the Kaala Santhi, early in the morning, the Ucchikālam, in the afternoon, the Sāyaratchai, in the evening and the Ardha Jāmam, at night, immediately prior to the temple being closed for the day.

Each ritual comprises four steps: abishegam (sacred bath), alangaram (decoration), naivethanam (food offering) and deepa aradanai (waving of lamps) for all the deities. After the abishegam, it is the practice to dress the idols of the deities, in an act called alangaram, in one of several guises. The worship is held with religious instructions in the Vedas (Sanskrit sacred texts) and Thirumurai (Tamil sacred texts) read by priests. These hours are marked by the tolling of the bell of the temple amidst music with nadaswaram (a pipe instrument) and thavil (a percussion instrument).

Devotees are able to perform archanai by the priest thereafter.

 Abishegam (6.45 am)
 Kaala Santhi (7.30 am)
 Abishegam (11.00 am)
 Utchikkalam Pooja (12 pm)
 Abishegam (5.00 pm)
 Sāyaratchai (6.00 pm)
 Abishegam (8.00 am)
 Ardha Jāmam (9 pm)

On festivals and special occasions, Abishegam and Poojas start earlier than the scheduled time.

Chithra Pournami (Chitraparuvam)
The Hindu Mahajana Sangam, with notable among the festivals, the annual Chitraparuvam Festival which is celebrated in the Tamil month of Chithirai (April/May) every year, is organised with a chariot procession of the panchaloha deity of Lord Subramaniyaswami from Queen Street Sri Mahamariamman Temple. It is the day of the first full moon of the first Tamil month. In early years, the festival starts with special pooja and ubayam for the Hindu Mahajana Sangam Koota Kadai in Queen Street Mahamariamman Temple, the chariot procession commences in the early morning 7.00 am and reached Waterfall Dewan Mahatma Gandhi (Gandhiji Ashram) in the afternoon, the deity then carried and placed in the ashram until the return journey of the chariot to Queen Street Sri Mahamariamman temple in the evening of the same day.

Since the early 1970s, this festival is celebrated for three days. The deity of Lord Subramaiyaswami is brought in procession from the Queen Street Sri Mahamariamman temple passing through many street and roads before reaching the Waterfall Arulmigu Sri Ganesha temple. The deity is carried up to the Hilltop Arulmigu Sri Balathadayuthapani Temple. On the second day is the Chitraparuvam Festival where the deity is taken in procession around the hilltop temple compound in the evening. On the third day evening, the deity is carried down and placed on the chariot procession journey back to the Queen Street Sri Mahamariamman temple. In 1992, the Hindu Mahajana Sangam imported a new chariot from India, for the annual Chitraparuvam Festival celebration to replace the old chariot which was found to be not road worthy and in a decaying condition.

See also
 List of Hindu temples in Malaysia
 Thaipusam
 Malaysian Indian

References

Religious buildings and structures in Penang
Hindu temples in Malaysia
Buildings and structures in George Town, Penang
Tourist attractions in George Town, Penang